Dumb Show is a three-character play written by Joe Penhall. First published in 2004, the play centers around the story of an out-of-control former TV comic named Barry.

Performances 
Dumb Show first premiered at the Royal Court Theatre in London on September 4, 2004, directed by Terry Johnson. Dumb Show later made its American debut at the South Coast Repertory in Costa Mesa, California in September 2005. In 2011, Dumb Show was performed at Keswick's Theatre by the Lake.

Plot 
Dumb Show opens in a scene where the TV personality, Barry, is meeting with John and Jane, private bankers. The bankers offer flattery and vintage champagne to Barry which he finds irresistible. Under the pretense of crafting a provocative after-dinner speech, John and Jane persuade Barry to reveal some of the more private aspects of his personal life. However, Barry doesn't plan to reveal any facts about his private life. Instead, he wanted to use John and Jane to get what he wants. 

The tension mounts and the stakes rise as the three characters take turns out-witting one another and rewriting reality according to their own agendas. In each turn, Dumb Show confronts questions of ethics, exploitation, and personal morality.

References

External links
Rupert Graves on-line Review

2004 plays